Te Awarua-o-Porirua Harbour, commonly known as Porirua Harbour, is a natural inlet in the south-western coast of the North Island of New Zealand.

The harbour is within the main urban area of the Wellington Region, and is surrounded by the city of Porirua, with the city centre to south of the harbour. It is a regional park, administered by Wellington Regional Council.

Geography

The harbour has an entrance only a few hundred metres in width, close to the suburb of Plimmerton. It opens up into two arms, Onepoto Arm to the south and Pauatahanui Arm to the north-east. Each arm is around three kilometres in length.

The Pauatahanui Inlet arm extends eastward to the settlement of Pauatahanui. The wetland there where the Pauatahanui Stream enters the Pauatahanui Inlet, is the largest remaining estuarine wetland in the lower North Island, and the Pauatahanui Wildlife Reserve was established in the 1980s to protect the inlet's environment and to restore damaged areas.

History
The Porirua Harbour formed when westward flowing rivers were drowned by rising postglacial sea levels approximately 10000-14000 years ago. There is a tradition that the 1855 Wairarapa Earthquake caused tectonic uplift in the Pauatahanui Arm of the inlet, changing the shoreline and reducing its navigability. However, according to George Eiby, the inlet always had limited accessibility, and the earthquake didn't significantly change the shoreline, with any changes likely coming from more recent sedimentation.

Part of the Porirua Inlet was reclaimed for a causeway carrying the North Island Main Trunk railway when the section between Porirua and Mana was straightened and double tracked. The new section of the Kapiti Line was opened on 7 November 1960. A new Paremata Railway Station and bridge over the entrance to the Pauatahanui Inlet were required.

The line no longer followed the curves of the shoreline bays north of Porirua, and three shallow lagoons on the land side of the new causeway were created. When State Highway 1 was re-aligned and straightened in the 1970s to run alongside the rail line, these lagoons were partially filled in. Aotea Lagoon was developed into a recreational area, albeit very polluted.

The name of the harbour was officially altered to Te Awarua-o-Porirua Harbour in August 2014.

Recreation

The Pauatahanui Inlet is used for windsurfing, but is not recommended for swimming.

North of Paremata are the swimming beaches of Plimmerton and Karehana Bay. The southern end of Plimmerton Beach is also exposed to northwesterly winds for windsurfing.

There are also fishing spots at Tokaapapa Reef (or Grandfather rocks) off Plimmerton, Mana Island and Hunters Bank. However, weather conditions can change quickly and can be hazardous.

Guardians of Pāuatahanui Inlet
A community group, the Guardians of Pāuatahanui Inlet, was set up in 1991 as a registered charity, to undertake tasks such as cleaning up around the inlet.  They also run photographic competitions.

Gallery

See also

 Porirua
 Kapiti Coast
 Mana Island
 Wellington Harbour

References

External links
Guardians of Pauatahanui Inlet's official page
Pauatahanui Wildlife Reserve information page
 Porirua Harbour and Catchment Programme (from WCC) 

Porirua
Ports and harbours of New Zealand
Geography of the Wellington Region
Regional parks of New Zealand
Landforms of the Wellington Region